Azzaba may refer to:
Azzaba, Algeria, a city in the Azzaba District, Skikda Province, Algeria
Azzaba, Morocco, a commune in the Sefrou Province of the Fès-Boulemane administrative region of Morocco